Laos competed at the 1992 Summer Olympics in Barcelona, Spain.

Competitors
The following is the list of number of competitors in the Games.

Results by event

Athletics
Men's 100m metres
Sitthixay Sacpraseuth
 Heat — 12.02 (→ did not advance)

Men's 200m metres
Bounhom Siliphone
 Heat — 23.64 (→ did not advance)

Men's 400m metres
Vanxay Sinebandith
 Heat — 51.71 (→ did not advance)

Men's 1500m metres
Khambieng Khamiar
 Heat — 4:04.82 (→ did not advance)

Men's 20 km Walk
Saleumphone Sopraseut — DSQ (→ no ranking)

References

Official Olympic Reports

Nations at the 1992 Summer Olympics
1992
1992 in Laotian sport